Hubert Lawrence "Larry" Anthony (12 March 189712 July 1957) was an Australian politician. He was a member of the Country Party and held ministerial office in the governments of Arthur Fadden and Robert Menzies, serving as Minister for Transport (1941), Postmaster-General (1949–1956), and Minister for Civil Aviation (1951–1954). A soldier and banana-grower before entering politics, he represented the New South Wales seat of Richmond from 1937 to 1957, which was later held by his son Doug Anthony and grandson Larry Anthony, the only three-generation dynasty in the history of the Australian House of Representatives.

Early life
Anthony was born in Warren, New South Wales, and had a limited education in bush schools. In 1914 he joined the Australian Army and spent World War I in the Signals Corps, seeing active duty in Gallipoli. He was discharged in 1916 following his return to Australia, where he was initially admitted to the first Auxiliary Hospital suffering from throat disease. After the war he settled at Murwillumbah on the NSW north coast, where he took up banana farming. By the 1930s he was the biggest banana-grower in Australia and chairman of the Banana Growers Federation. This made him an influential figure in the politics of the Northern Rivers region.

Politics

In 1937 Anthony was elected to the House of Representatives as Country Party member for the seat of Richmond. As a powerful figure in the party he had rapid promotion. He was an Honorary Minister 1940–1941, and Minister for Transport in 1941. During the years of the wartime Australian Labor Party government (1941–1949), he was a senior member of the Opposition.

In 1949 the conservatives returned to power under Robert Menzies, and Anthony became Postmaster-General, adding the post of Minister for Civil Aviation in 1951. He held these posts until his sudden death at Murwillumbah in 1957. He was succeeded as Member for Richmond by his son Doug Anthony, then aged 27. Doug Anthony was later leader of the Country Party and Deputy Prime Minister of Australia 1971–1972 and 1975–1983. Doug's son Larry Anthony was Member for Richmond 1996–2004 and was a junior minister in the Howard government.

The Anthonys are the only three-generation dynasty in the House of Representatives, although Alexander Downer is the son of a federal MP and the grandson of a Senator.

See also
Anthony family

References

External links
 National Archives of Australia: (Army – World War I: 1914–18) – Military service extract: Anthony, Hubert Lawrence

Further reading

1897 births
1957 deaths
Australian monarchists
Members of the Cabinet of Australia
Members of the Australian House of Representatives
Members of the Australian House of Representatives for Richmond
National Party of Australia members of the Parliament of Australia
Australian military personnel of World War I
20th-century Australian politicians